The Royal Australian Infantry Corps (RA Inf) is the parent corps for all infantry regiments of the Australian Army. It was established on 14 December 1948, with its Royal Corps status being conferred by His Majesty King George VI. At her coronation in 1953, Queen Elizabeth II became Colonel-in-Chief of the corps. Major components of the RA Inf include the various battalions of the Royal Australian Regiment and the six state-based Australian infantry regiments, such as the Royal New South Wales Regiment. The various Regional Force Surveillance and Special Forces units of the Army are also part of the corps. The School of Infantry (SOI) is located at Singleton, New South Wales, and forms part of the Combined Arms Training Centre.

The "Head of Corps – Infantry" is usually a Brigadier and is the Honorary Colonel of the Royal Australian Regiment.

Role
The role of the Royal Australian Infantry is to seek out and close with the enemy, to kill or capture him, to seize and hold ground, to repel attack, by day or night, regardless of season, weather or terrain.

History 
The Australian Infantry Corps was formed on 14 December 1948.

Organisation

Regiments

Regular Army Regiments
Royal Australian Regiment
1st Battalion, Royal Australian Regiment
2nd Battalion, Royal Australian Regiment
3rd Battalion, Royal Australian Regiment
5th Battalion, Royal Australian Regiment
6th Battalion, Royal Australian Regiment
7th Battalion, Royal Australian Regiment
8th/9th Battalion, Royal Australian Regiment

State Regiments
Royal Queensland Regiment
9th Battalion, Royal Queensland Regiment
25th/49th Battalion, Royal Queensland Regiment
31st/42nd Battalion, Royal Queensland Regiment
Royal New South Wales Regiment
1st/19th Battalion, Royal New South Wales Regiment
2nd/17th Battalion, Royal New South Wales Regiment
4th/3rd Battalion, Royal New South Wales Regiment
41st Battalion, Royal New South Wales Regiment
Royal Victoria Regiment
5th/6th Battalion, Royal Victoria Regiment
8th/7th Battalion, Royal Victoria Regiment
Royal South Australia Regiment
10th/27th Battalion, Royal South Australia Regiment
Royal Western Australia Regiment
11th/28th Battalion, Royal Western Australia Regiment
16th Battalion, Royal Western Australia Regiment
Royal Tasmania Regiment
12th/40th Battalion, Royal Tasmania Regiment

Training Regiments
Sydney University Regiment
Melbourne University Regiment
Queensland University Regiment
Adelaide Universities Regiment
Western Australia University Regiment
University of New South Wales Regiment
Monash University Regiment

Regional Force Surveillance
NORFORCE
Pilbara Regiment
Far North Queensland Regiment
51st Battalion, Far North Queensland Regiment

Special Forces
Special Air Service Regiment
1st Commando Regiment
2nd Commando Regiment

School of Infantry 
Commanders of the School of Infantry

Notes

References

Infantry
Military units and formations established in 1948
Australian army units with royal patronage
1948 establishments in Australia
Australia